The 46th Engineer Battalion ("Steel Spike") is a military engineer unit in the United States Army that was formally established in 1917.

Mission
On order, the 46th Engineer Battalion deploys to command, to control, and to execute combat and/or general engineering in support of U.S. Army, Joint, and Coalition Forces.

Organization
The Battalion consist of the following units:
HHC
FSC
22nd S+D DET (Inactivated)
93rd EN CO (VERT) (Inactivated)
178th EN CO (VERT) (Inactivated)
524th EN DET
573rd EN CO
687th EN CO
642nd EN CO (Fort Drum, NY)
814th MRBC (moved to Korea under 11th EN BN)

Lineage
Constituted 7 December 1917 in the National Army as the 46th Engineers

Organized March–April 1918 at Camp Sheridan, Alabama

Converted and redesignated 18 September 1918 as the 46th Regiment, Transportation Corps

Regiment broken up 12 November 1918 and its elements reorganized and redesignated as follows:
Regimental Headquarters and Headquarters Company disbanded
Companies A, B, and C redesignated 12 December 1918 each as the 29th, 30th, and 31st Companies, Transportation Corps, respectively

29th Company, Transportation Corps, demobilized 13 July 1919 at Camp Devens, Massachusetts; 30th and 31st Companies, Transportation Corps, demobilized 2 July and 11 July 1919, respectively, at Camp Gordon, Georgia

Regiment reconstituted 1 October 1933 in the Regular Army as the 46th Engineers

Activated 14 July 1941 at Camp Bowie, Texas

Redesignated 18 March 1943 as the 46th Engineer General Service Regiment

Reorganized and redesignated 22 April 1944 as the 46th Engineer Construction Battalion

Reorganized and redesignated 15 June 1947 as Headquarters and Headquarters and Service Company, 46th Engineer Construction Battalion (organic elements concurrently absorbed)

Inactivated 15 March 1950 in Japan

Redesignated 22 September 1950 as the 46th Engineer Construction Battalion and activated at Fort Sill, Oklahoma (organic elements concurrently reconstituted and activated)

Reorganized and redesignated 23 November 1953 as the 46th Engineer Battalion

Battalion departs the Republic of Vietnam (South Vietnam) in 1971 and is assigned to Fort Rucker, Alabama under the 18th Engineer Brigade. The battalion deploys to the Republic of Honduras in the fall of 1983 to construct base camp facilities and airfields as part of Operation Ahuas Tara II before returning to Fort Rucker in the spring of 1984.  The battalion deploys to Operation Desert Shield in the fall of 1990, serving in Operation Desert Storm and returning to Fort Rucker in May 1991. In late 1993, segments of the battalion deployed to Colombia, South America to participate in the construction of several community and infrastructure projects. Those segments returned to Fort Rucker in early 1994.  In mid-1994, the battalion is relocated to Fort Polk, Louisiana due to the Base Realignment and Closure (BRAC) and to support the Joint Readiness Training Center (JRTC).  This relocation did not include Bravo Company.

1996: Deployment to Haiti in support of NATO mission under President Bill Clinton.

16 October 1999: Battalion reorganized as a multi-component unit; Company C concurrently inactivated. The 890th Engineer Company (Tennessee Army National Guard) reorganized and redesignated as Company C, 46th Engineer Battalion. This company was also located at Ft. Rucker Alabama. It was deactivated and moved to Ft. Polk La.

October 2005: the battalion was deployed to Iraq. During the one-year deployment, A Company and C Company were based from Al-Taqqadum with elements near Syria and Ramadi. B Company and HHC were primarily operated from Camp Ramadi. Elements of the battalion participated in the Battle of Ramadi (2006) establishing combat outposts (COPs) and patrol bases throughout the city. These operations were often executed under direct fire and/or indirect fire. Four members of the battalion were KIA during the duration of the deployment—two due to mortar attacks and two to improvised explosive devices.

October 2006: the battalion returns to the United States.

February 2010: B Company deactivated while still garrisoned at Fort Rucker, Alabama. The battalion is transformed from legacy to modular battalion on 16 February 2010.

Campaign Participation Credit
World War I
Streamer without inscription

World War II
East Indies
Papua
New Guinea
Leyte (with arrowhead)
Luzon

Vietnam
Defense
Counteroffensive
Counteroffensive, Phase II
Counteroffensive Phase III
Tet Counteroffensive
Counteroffensive Phase IV
Counteroffensive Phase V
Counteroffensive Phase VI
Tet 69/Counteroffensive
Summer-Fall 1969
Winter-Spring 1970
Sanctuary Counteroffensive
Counteroffensive Phase VII
Consolidation I

Southwest Asia
Defense of Saudi Arabia
Liberation and Defense of Kuwait
Operation Iraqi Freedom

Decorations
Presidential Unit Citation (Army) for PAPUA
Meritorious Unit Commendation (Army) for LEYTE
Meritorious Unit Commendation (Army) for PHILIPPINE ISLANDS
Meritorious Unit Commendation (Army) for VIETNAM 1966–1967
Meritorious Unit Commendation (Army) for VIETNAM 1967
Meritorious Unit Commendation (Army) for SOUTHWEST ASIA
Army Superior Unit Award for 1995–1996
Army Superior Unit Award for 2011–2013 (DCRF mission)
Philippine Presidential Unit Citation for 17 OCTOBER 1944 TO 4 JULY 1945
Republic of Vietnam Civil Action Honor Medal, First Class for VIETNAM 1967–1970

References

046
Military units and formations established in 1944